Elusa oenolopha is a species of moth of the family Noctuidae. It is known from Australia, including Queensland and New South Wales.

The forewings are brown with a small lopsided white dumbbell shape near the centre of each forewing. The hindwings are a uniform pale brown.

References

Hadeninae
Moths of Australia